Pinky Bompal Magar is an Indian former footballer who played as a forward. She was elected as a member of the technical committee of the All India Football Federation in September 2022.

Career
Magar was born in Jharsuguda in Odisha to parents Ram Bahadur Bompal Magar and Purnima Devi. She represented Odisha and Railways football teams in Senior Women's National Football Championship.

Magar made her debut for India at the 2006 AFC Women's Asian Cup qualification against Guam and scored her first goal in the match. She represented India at the 2008 AFC Women's Asian Cup qualification and the 2012 Olympics Qualifiers. She was a part of the national winning squads which played in the 2010 and 2012 SAFF Women's Championships. In the 2012 SAFF Women's Championship edition, she scored a hat-trick against Bhutan.

Honours

India
 SAFF Championship: 2010, 2012
 South Asian Games Gold medal: 2010

Orissa / Odisha
 Senior Women's National Football Championship: 2010–11, runner-up: 2007–08, 2009–10
 National Games Silver medal: 2015

Railways
 Senior Women's National Football Championship: 2015–16

References

External links
 

Living people
1986 births
People from Jharsuguda district
Footballers from Odisha
Sportswomen from Odisha
Indian Gorkhas
Indian women's footballers
India women's international footballers
Women's association football forwards
South Asian Games gold medalists for India
South Asian Games medalists in football